Captain Sir Arthur Henderson Young  (31 October 1854 – 20 October 1938) was a British colonial administrator.

Family
He was the son of Colonel Keith Young.

On 5 November 1885, he married Lady Evelyn Anne Kennedy, a daughter of Archibald Kennedy, 2nd Marquess of Ailsa, and Julia Jephson.

Education
Young was educated at Edinburgh Academy and the Royal Military College, Sandhurst.

Career
Young joined the 27th Inniskillings as a sub-lieutenant, and entered the Colonial Service in 1878. He was first appointed to command a Military Police unit in Cyprus. The next 27 years he spent in the colony, holding successively the positions of Assistant Commissioner at Paphos, later Commissioner at Paphos, Commissioner at Famagusta, then Director of Survey and Forest Officer and Chief Secretary to the Government of Cyprus. In 1883 he contested the first elections to the new Legislative Council, but finished last in the Larnaca–Famagusta constituency with only 43 votes of the 6,899 cast. Young ran again in the 1891 elections; on this occasion his candidacy aroused significant controversy, and was opposed by both Greek Cypriots and the High Commissioner. Although he failed to be elected, he successfully appealed to the Supreme Court to have the election results partially annulled on the basis of intimidation and corruption due to attempts by the priesthood to dissuade people from voting for him. However, he did not contest the subsequent by-election for the vacant seats.

For six months in 1895, and for lesser periods in 1898, 1900, and 1904, Young administered the Government of Cyprus. In 1902, he went on a special mission to St. Vincent in the West Indies. He was posted as the Colonial Secretary of the Straits Settlements on 29 June 1906 until 1911. He became the British High Commissioner in Malaya and Governor of the Straits Settlements from 1911 to 1920.

Honours
In 1897, Young was appointed Companion of the Order of St Michael and St George (CMG) and Knight Commander of the Order of St Michael and St George (KCMG) in November 1908.

In 1916, Young was appointed Knight Grand Cross of the Order of St Michael and St George (GCMG) and Knight Commander of the Order of the British Empire (KBE) in 1918.

See also 
 FMS KL No 3663/1917 From E L Brockman to Chung Thye Phin on Appointment to Federal Council
 Appointment of Chung Thye Phin to the Federal Council of the FMS by Arthur Henderson Young

References

Sources
Arnold Wright, Twientieth Century Impressions of British Malaya, 1908
Charles Mosley, editor, Burke's Peerage and Baronetage, 106th edition, 2 volumes (Crans, Switzerland: Burke's Peerage (Genealogical Books) Ltd, 1999), volume 1, page 42

1854 births
1938 deaths
Knights Grand Cross of the Order of St Michael and St George
Knights Commander of the Order of the British Empire
Administrators in British Singapore
Governors of the Straits Settlements
Graduates of the Royal Military College, Sandhurst
Chief Secretaries of Singapore